Inge Brück (born 12 October 1936) is a German singer and actress, best known internationally for her participation in the 1967 Eurovision Song Contest.

Brück began her singing career with the Erwin Lehn Dance Orchestra, where she was noticed by pianist Horst Jankowski, who arranged a television appearance with Hans-Joachim Kulenkampff, following which she was offered a recording contract. In 1957, she had a hit with "Peter, komm heut' abend zum Hafen", a version of "Green Door", which reached No. 7 in the German chart.  In the late 1950s and early 1960s, she made numerous TV appearances, appeared in stage musicals and toured with orchestras including those of Jankowski and Hazy Osterwald.

Following a 1966 victory in an International Song Festival in Brazil, Brück was selected by broadcaster NDR to be the German representative in the 1967 Eurovision Song Contest.  The chosen song "Anouschka" was internally selected by the channel. Brück went forward to the 12th Eurovision, held on 8 April in Vienna, where "Anouschka" finished in joint eight place of the 17 entries.

Following her Eurovision appearance, Brück decided to concentrate on acting, and in 1970 she starred in a 13-part series for ZDF called  in which she played the title role, a cleaning lady/amateur detective, which was a ratings hit and regularly drew audiences of over 20 million. Since the 1970s, Brück has concentrated on performing songs with religious content.  Along with fellow Eurovision veterans Katja Ebstein and Peter Horton, she is a member of the initiative Künstler für Christus (Artists For Christ).

References 

1936 births
Living people
Musicians from Mannheim
German women singers
Eurovision Song Contest entrants for Germany
Eurovision Song Contest entrants of 1967
German television actresses
20th-century German actresses
Actors from Mannheim